Travel Edition 1990–2005 is a compilation album by the British pop band Saint Etienne. It was released 22 November 2004 in the United States only on the Sub Pop label.

Travel Edition is the band's first compilation released in the US, as previous collections Too Young to Die and Smash the System: Singles and More were released in Europe only.

As a sweetener to fans, the compilation features two new tracks: "Primrose Hill" and "Fascination." "Primrose Hill" is essentially a stripped-down instrumental version of the single "Soft Like Me." The collection also features the rarely heard edit of "Avenue."

Track listing

Personnel 
Saint Etienne are:

 Pete Wiggs
 Bob Stanley
 Sarah Cracknell

Additional Contributions:
 Moira Lambert - Vocals on "Only Love Can Break Your Heart"
 Etienne Daho - Vocals on "He's On The Phone"

References 

2005 greatest hits albums
Saint Etienne (band) compilation albums
Sub Pop compilation albums